Frederic Michael Raphael (born 14 August 1931) is an American-British BAFTA and Academy Award winning screenwriter, biographer, nonfiction writer, novelist and journalist.

Early life
Raphael was born in Chicago, to an American Jewish mother from Chicago, Irene Rose (nee Mauser) and a British Jewish father, Cederic Michael Raphael, an employee of the Shell Oil Company who had been transferred to the United States from Shell's London office. In 1938, when Raphael was seven, and to his surprise, the family migrated to England and settled in Putney, London. He was educated at Copthorne Preparatory School, Charterhouse School, and St John's College, Cambridge.

Career
Raphael won an Oscar for the screenplay for the movie Darling (1965), and two years later received an Oscar nomination for his screenplay for Two for the Road. He also wrote the screenplay for the 1967 film adaptation of Thomas Hardy's Far From the Madding Crowd directed by John Schlesinger.

His articles and book reviews appear in a number of newspapers and magazines, including the Los Angeles Times and The Sunday Times. He has published more than twenty novels, the best-known being the semi-autobiographical The Glittering Prizes (1976), which traces the lives of a group of Cambridge University undergraduates in post-war Britain as they move through university and into the wider world. The original six-part BBC television series, from which the book was adapted, won him a Royal Television Society Writer of the Year Award. The sequel, Fame and Fortune, which continues the story to 1979, was adapted in 2007 and broadcast on BBC Radio 4. In 2010, BBC Radio 4 broadcast a further sequel in a series entitled Final Demands, with Tom Conti as Adam Morris, the central character, bringing the story to the late 1990s.

Raphael has published several history books, collections of essays and translations.  He has also written biographies of W. Somerset Maugham and Lord Byron.  He was made a Fellow of the Royal Society of Literature in 1964.

In 1999, Raphael published Eyes Wide Open, a memoir of his collaboration with the director Stanley Kubrick on the screenplay of Eyes Wide Shut, Kubrick's final movie. Raphael wrote a detailed account of his working with Kubrick, based on his own journals, but upon its publication the book was publicly criticised by several of the director's friends and family members, among them Christiane Kubrick, Jan Harlan, and Michael Herr, for its unflattering portrayal of him.

Referring to an article by Raphael about his book in The New Yorker, Steven Spielberg and Tom Cruise also professed criticism.

That year, Penguin Books published a new translation of Arthur Schnitzler's Dream Story, the basis for Eyes Wide Shut, featuring a new introduction by Raphael.

Personal life
He married Sylvia Betty Glatt on 17 January 1955, and they had three children. His daughter, Sarah Raphael, was an English artist known for her portraits. She died in 2001.

Selected works

Film and TV

Fiction
 Obbligato (1956)
 The Earlsdon Way (1958)
 The Limits of Love (1960)
 A Wild Surmise (1961)
 The Graduate Wife (1962)
 The Trouble with England (1962)
 Lindmann (1963)
 Orchestra and Beginners (1967)
 Like Men Betrayed (1970)
 Who Were You With Last Night? (1971)
 April, June and November (1972)
 Richard's Things (1973)
 California Time (1975)
 The Glittering Prizes (1976) (adapted from the TV series)
 Sleeps Six and other stories (1979) (short story collection)
 Heaven and Earth (1985)
 Think of England (1986)
 After the War (1990)
 The Hidden Eye (1990)
 Of Gods and Men (1992)
 A Double Life (1993)
 Coast to Coast (1998)
 Fame and Fortune (2007) (sequel to The Glittering Prizes)
 Final Demands (2010) (sequel to Fame and Fortune) 
 Private Views (2015)
 The Limits of Love (2020)

Non-fiction
 Somerset Maugham and his World (1976)
 The List of Books: A Library of Over 3000 Works (with Kenneth McLeish) Harmony Books, New York City, 1981. .
 The Necessity of Anti-Semitism (1998)
 Popper: Historicism and Its Poverty 1998
 Some Talk of Alexander: A Journey Through Space and Time in the Greek World (2006)
 Literary Genius: 25 Classic Writers Who Define English & American Literature (2007) (Illustrated by Barry Moser)
 How Stanley Kubrick Met His Waterloo (2011) for the Wall Street Journal
 A Jew Among Romans: The Life and Legacy of Flavius Josephus (2013)
 Distant Intimacy: A Friendship in the Age of the Internet (2013) with Joseph Epstein
 Where Were We?: The Conversation Continues (2015) with Joseph Epstein
 Anti-Semitism (2015)

Translations
 The serpent son = Oresteia by Aeschylus (translated with Kenneth McLeish) (1978)
 The Poems of Catullus (translated with Kenneth McLeish) (1979)

Memoirs
 Eyes Wide Open (1999)
 Personal Terms (2001)
 The Benefit of Doubt: Essays (2003)
 A Spoilt Boy: A Memoir of a Childhood (2003)
 Rough Copy: Personal Terms 2 (2004)
 Cuts and Bruises: Personal Terms 3 (2006)
 Ticks and Crosses: Personal Terms 4 (2009)
 Ifs and Buts: Personal Terms 5 (2011)
 There and Then: Personal Terms 6 (2013)
 Going Up: To Cambridge and Beyond - A Writer's Memoir (2015)
 Against the Stream: Personal Terms 7 (2018)

References

External links

 Raphael film reference entry
 
 Raphael's BFI entry
 Yahoo biography
 Plays by Raphael 

1931 births
Alumni of St John's College, Cambridge
Best British Screenplay BAFTA Award winners
Best Original Screenplay Academy Award winners
British writers
Jewish American journalists
Fellows of the Royal Society of Literature
Living people
People educated at Copthorne Preparatory School
People educated at Charterhouse School
21st-century American Jews